AXS may refer to:

Anschutz Entertainment Group
 AXS (company), primary ticket platform developed by Anschutz Entertainment Group (AEG).
 AXS TV, a cable channel partially owned by Anschutz Entertainment Group (AEG).

Other
 Access (group), a Japanese pop group which once spelled its name AXS
 AXS GmbH, now part of Bruker, a scientific instruments company based in Billerica, Massachusetts, USA